Steven Vidler (born 1960) is an Australian actor known for his part in the Scottish–Australian series Jeopardy.

Career
His film credits include The Good Wife (1987) where he played "Sugar", the younger brother who 'knew' his brother's wife. Vidler made his feature film directorial debut with the 1997 film Blackrock. He was the good-meaning teacher, Mr Simmons in the BAFTA award-winning Jeopardy and also plays Neil Webster, Tara's father in the Australian drama Dance Academy, he also played officer Frank Williams in WWE Films' See No Evil (2006).

Filmography

Films

Television

External links 

1960 births
Living people
AACTA Award winners
Australian male film actors
Australian male television actors